If There Is a Reason to Study (Native title: 學習的理由) is a documentary film spanning 7 years directed by Adler Yang. The production of the film started in March 2009, when Adler Yang was 14 years old, studying at the Humanity (RenWen) Junior High School as a grade 8 student. The film was theatrically released in Taiwan and Hong Kong since August 2016 by crowdfunding, screening at major theaters in Taipei, Taoyuan, Taichung, Kaohsiung, Yilan, Kowloon, etc. The film has also been selected in more than 10 film festivals internationally, receiving 11 awards and recognitions.

In the film, Adler Yang documented the story of his friends' in the Humanity Junior High facing the high-stakes high school entrance exam, the Basic Competence Test (BCT), and followed them until their college years. The film not only examines how high-stakes testing and the tracking systems' shapes students' lives in the long run, but also uncovers a more universal struggle that happens beyond school, when people's pursuit of resources, recognition, or power shakes the foundation of their identities.

Reception and influence 

Originally titled The Soul -- I Don't Want the BCT, the film has been publicly known in Taiwan since 2010, as the project was surprisingly selected as a grantee by the Public Television Service. Since then, Adler Yang and his team at an average age of 15 have been continually invited to educational meetings and conferences to represent the voice of students, joining the public discourse of education reform.

First started in 2001, the BCT was announced to be replaced in a few years by President Ma Ying-Jeou on January 1, 2011. In 2013, the last BCT had ended, replaced by the Comprehensive Assessment Program in 2014.

In the 2014 South Taiwan Film Festival, Golden Bell Award Best Director John Hsu considered If There is a Reason to Study one of the three most surprising films in the festival, praising that it is the "best work among all recent films addressing the education and testing culture in Taiwan. Talented and sincere."

On August 12, 2016, Deputy Minister of Education Chen Liang-gee met with Adler Yang and his teammates for their contribution to Taiwanese education, invited them to participate in future collaborations, and praised the film for its authentic representation of the education in Taiwan.

The film was praised as the "epitome of 2016 Taiwanese Movies" by film critic and Golden Horse Film Festival judge Bing-Hong Zheng. He also noted that If There is a Reason to Study is the most successful crowdfunded Taiwanese documentary project in 2016, reaching 282% of its initial goal

The film's Chinese title "學習的理由(literal translation: reason to study)" has since then become a common term widely used in the education discourse in Taiwan even when the actual film was not being conversed.

References

External links 
 
 If There Is a Reason to Study Official Website
 Full movie on Vimeo On Demand 
 Full movie on Alexander Street

Documentary films about education
2016 films
Taiwanese documentary films
Films set in Taiwan
Education in Taiwan
Films shot in Taiwan
Films set in the 2000s
Films set in the 2010s